The 1984 North Dakota gubernatorial election took place on November 6, 1984 to elect the Governor and Lieutenant Governor of North Dakota. Voters selected Democratic candidate George A. Sinner and his running mate Ruth Meiers over Republican incumbent Governor Allen I. Olson and Lieutenant Governor Ernest Sands.

See also
United States gubernatorial elections, 1984

References

Gubernatorial
1984
North Dakota